Kan Balam can refer to:

 Kan Bahlam I (524–583), ajaw of Palenque
 K'inich Kan Bahlam II (635-702), ajaw of Palenque 
 Kan Balam, super computer in Latin America